Herbert Hainer (born 3 July 1954) is a German businessman and the former CEO of Adidas-Group, as well as supervisory board chairman of the FC Bayern Munich AG. He is currently the president of the football club FC Bayern Munich.

Education
Hainer was educated at the University of Applied Sciences Landshut, where he graduated in economics.

Career
 1979–1987 Procter & Gamble, Division Manager Sales and Marketing Germany
 1987–1989: adidas Germany, Sales Director Hardware
 1989–1991: adidas Germany, Sales Director Field
 1991–1993: adidas Germany, National Sales Director
 1993–1995: adidas Germany, Managing Director Sales
 1996–1997: adidas AG, Senior Vice President Region Europe, Africa, Middle East
 1997–1999: adidas AG, Member of the Executive Board
 1999–2001: adidas-Salomon AG, Deputy Chairman of the Executive Board
 2001-2016: adidas-group AG, CEO and Chairman of the Executive Board
 13.03.2014–02.05.2014: Chairman interim of FC Bayern Munich e.V.
 15.11.2019–present: President of FC Bayern Munich

Hainer was named a trustee of the Bundesliga Foundation at the DFL's New Year reception. On 15 November 2019, Hainer was elected the president of Bayern Munich. He succeeded Uli Hoeneß as Bayern's president. On 15 October 2022, Hainer was re-elected as FC Bayern president during their annual general meeting, with 78% of the votes in favour of him.

References

External links 
 "Herbert Hainer, Adidas", European CEO, 16 March 2010. Retrieved 9 November 2010.
 "Executive Profile: Herbert Hainer" Business Week. Retrieved 9 November 2010.

1954 births
Living people
German billionaires
Adidas people
FC Bayern Munich board members
People from Dingolfing-Landau